Solomon Osei-Akoto (born 3 June 1930) was a Ghanaian politician. He was member of parliament for Birim-Abirem from 1969 to 1972 and also served as  ministerial secretary(deputy minister) for transport and communication under the Busia regime.

Early life and education
Solomon was born on 3 June 1930 at Akoasi in the Eastern Region of Ghana.

He had his early education at Nsawam primary and middle school from 1938 to 1947. He received his teachers' certificate A in 1951 from the Akropong Presbyterian Training College. He continued at Sadler Baptist Secondary School from 1957 to 1961 for his G. C. E. Ordinary and Advanced level certificates. He left for the United States of America in 1961 to study business administration at the Kentucky State College, Frankfort, Kentucky and received his bachelor's degree in 1964. He had further studies in business administration at the Wharton School of the University of Pennsylvania in Philadelphia where he was awarded his master of business administration degree in Industrial Management.

Career
His teaching career begun 1952 after obtaining his teachers' certificate. He taught at Pekyi-Ashanti Presby middle school until 1956 when he obtained admission to study at the Sadler Baptist Secondary School. In 1967, he gained employment at the State Pharmaceutical Corporation in Accra as its personnel manager. A year later he was elected as the first president of the Association of Business Graduates. He also worked as an Administrative Officer with the Institute of Aquatic Biology, Council for Scientific and Industrial Research.

Politics
He was elected as a member of parliament representing the Birim-Abirem constituency on 29 August 1969. That same year he was appointed ministerial secretary(deputy minister) for transport and communications. He served in that capacity together with Joseph Yaw Manu until 1972 when the Busia government was overthrown.

Personal life
He married Janet Osei-Akoto in January 1952. Together they had six children. His hobbies included football, hockey, swimming and debates. He is a Christian.

See also
 List of MPs elected in the 1969 Ghanaian parliamentary election
 Busia government

References

1930 births
Possibly living people
Akan people
Ghanaian MPs 1969–1972
Kentucky State University alumni
Wharton School of the University of Pennsylvania alumni
University of Pennsylvania alumni
Progress Party (Ghana) politicians
20th-century Ghanaian politicians
Ghanaian educators
Presbyterian College of Education, Akropong alumni
Kumasi Academy alumni